The Spanish Apartments is a historic site in Davis Islands, Tampa, Florida, United States. It was added to the National Register of Historic Places on August 3, 1989.

References

External links
 Hillsborough County listings at National Register of Historic Places
 Hillsborough County listings at Florida's Office of Cultural and Historical Programs

Buildings and structures in Tampa, Florida
National Register of Historic Places in Tampa, Florida
Apartment buildings in Florida
Residential buildings on the National Register of Historic Places in Florida
Mediterranean Revival architecture of Davis Islands, Tampa, Florida
1925 establishments in Florida